Attila Balázs (born September 27, 1988) is a Hungarian professional tennis player. 
He has a career-high singles ATP ranking of No. 76 achieved on 2 March 2020. He is a seven time Hungarian National Tennis Champion; after Béla von Kehrling, József Asbóth and István Gulyás. He is the fourth Hungarian player who was able to win at least 6 consecutive National Championships.

Career
As a  qualifier, he reached the semifinals of the 2012 BRD Năstase Țiriac Trophy in Bucharest and was defeated by Fabio Fognini.

His next best result was the quarterfinals seven years later as a wildcard at the 2019 Hungarian Open with victories over Hubert Hurkacz and sixth seed John Millman.

Next he reached his first ATP final at the 2019 Croatia Open Umag where he lost against Dušan Lajović as a qualifier.

In 2020, he reached the semifinals of the ATP 500 2020 Rio Open tournament as a lucky loser where he was defeated by Gianluca Mager.

ATP career finals

Singles: 1 (1 runner up)

Challenger and Futures finals

Singles: 47 (31–16)

Doubles: 20 (16–4)

Davis Cup

Participations: (19–13)

   indicates the outcome of the Davis Cup match followed by the score, date, place of event, the zonal classification and its phase, and the court surface.

Record against other players

Balazs's match record against players who have been ranked in the top 50, with those who are active in boldface. 
ATP Tour, Challenger and Future tournaments' main draw and qualifying matches are considered.

References

External links

Hungarian male tennis players
1988 births
Tennis players from Budapest
Living people